Conner Huertas del Pino and Mats Rosenkranz were the defending champions but only Huertas del Pino chose to defend his title, partnering Alexander Merino. Huertas del Pino lost in the first round to Murkel Dellien and Jorge Panta.

Guillermo Durán and Felipe Meligeni Alves won the title after defeating Luciano Darderi and Juan Bautista Torres 3–6, 6–4, [10–3] in the final.

Seeds

Draw

References

External links
 Main draw

Challenger de Tigre II - Doubles